The 2008 congressional elections in Indiana were held on November 4, 2008 to determine who will represent the State of Indiana in the United States House of Representatives. Indiana has nine seats in the House, apportioned according to the 2000 United States Census. Representatives are elected for two-year terms; those elected will serve in the 111th Congress from January 3, 2009 until January 3, 2011. The elections coincide with the 2008 U.S. presidential election.

The delegation comprised five Democrats and four Republicans. All 9 incumbents won re-election. As of 2021, this is the last time in which Democrats won a majority of congressional districts in Indiana.

District makeup

Overview

District 1

This district includes a small strip of northwest Indiana and had been represented by Democrat Pete Visclosky since January 1985. The district has been one of the most Democratic in Indiana. John Kerry defeated George W. Bush in this district 55% to 44% in 2004. CQ Politics forecast the race as Safe Democrat.

Results

District 2

This district is centered on South Bend, Indiana and the Indiana portion of the Michiana region. It had been represented by Democrat Joe Donnelly since January 2007. CQ Politics forecast the race as Safe Democrat.

Polling

Results

District 3

This district is located in the northeast corner of Indiana and has a large population center in Fort Wayne. Republican Mark Souder represented the district since January 1995 and was challenged by Mike Montagano in 2008. CQ Politics forecast the race as Leans Republican. George W. Bush defeated John Kerry in this district 68% to 31%.

Polling

Results

District 4

This district is located in west-central Indiana. Located within the district is the city of West Lafayette, Lafayette, Bedford, Monticello, Brownsburg, Plainfield, Zionsville, Lebanon, Frankfort, Greenwood and parts of Indianapolis and many smaller suburban towns. It had been represented by Republican Steve Buyer since January 1993. CQ Politics forecast the race as Safe Republican.

Polling

Results

District 5

This district located mostly north of Indianapolis is one of the most reliably Republican in America, having voted 71%-28% for George W. Bush in 2004. It was represented by Republican Dan Burton. CQ Politics forecast the race as Safe Republican.

Results

District 6

This district takes in a large portion of eastern Indiana, including the cities of Muncie, Anderson, and Richmond. It was represented by Republican Mike Pence. CQ Politics forecast the race as Safe Republican.

Results

District 7

This district is in the heart of Central Indiana and encompasses most of Marion County/Indianapolis. André Carson won the special election to fill this seat and represented  since March 13, 2008. 

Carson won the primary election with 46%, while Woody Myers received 24%, David Orentlicher received 21%, and Carolene Mays received 8%. Carson and his Republican challenger in the special election, Jon Elrod, were set to face off in the General Election but Elrod dropped out. Gabrielle Campo was selected by a party caucus to face the incumbent, Carson. John Kerry defeated George W. Bush in this district 58% to 41% in 2004. CQ Politics forecast the race as Safe Democratic.

Polling

Results

District 8

This district has been nicknamed the "Bloody Eighth" because of a series of hard-fought tight campaigns and political reversals.  It ousted six incumbents from 1966 to 1982. The election in 1984 was so close that it was decided in Congress. In 2000, a New York Times reporter said of the district: "With a populist streak and a conservative bent, this district does not cotton to country-club Republicans or to social-engineering liberals," and also said "More than 95 percent white and about 41 percent rural, the region shares much of the flavor of the Bible Belt." Evansville and Terre Haute are located within its limits and was represented by Democrat Brad Ellsworth. CQ Politics forecast the race as Safe Democratic.

Results

District 9

This district is located in southeast Indiana. This swing district has been recently fought out by Democrat Baron Hill and Republican Mike Sodrel. Hill beat Sodrel in 2002, Sodrel beat Hill in 2004, and Hill beat Sodrel in 2006 to become the 9th's representative. Hill spent the most on his campaign of those in Indiana, spending $2.2 million. The largest city located within the district is Bloomington followed by Columbus, New Albany, Jeffersonville, and Clarksville which all have Democratic Mayors or Council Presidents. CQ Politics forecast the race as Democrat Favored.

Polling

Results

See also
United States House of Representatives elections, 2008
Indiana gubernatorial election, 2008

References

External links
Indiana Elections Division
U.S. Congress candidates for Indiana at Project Vote Smart

2008
Indiana
United States House of Representatives